The Great Atlantic Sargassum Belt, is a mass of Sargassum in the Atlantic Ocean that is the largest macroalgae bloom in the world.

History

This Sargassum was first reported by Christopher Columbus in the 15th century but recently appeared in 2011 in the Atlantic.

As of 2023, the belt is estimated to weigh about 5.5 million metric tonnes and extends , stretching from West Africa to the Gulf of Mexico.

Effects
Due to the smell, the attracted insects, and the sheer amount of it piling up on beaches, the Sargassum Belt is having a negative impact of communities in the Caribbean and West Africa. When the Sargassum dies after about 48 hours on land, it releases hydrogen sulfide, a toxic gas. The sulfide can irritate eyes, nose and throat and releases a smell akin to rotting eggs. The sulfide also can affect people with respiratory problems including asthma. In 2022, the largest bloom on record was recorded, causing Guadeloupe to issue a health alert, as well as the US Virgin Islands issuing a state of emergency, requesting help from FEMA.

Cause
The buildup of Sargassum is caused by nutrients flowing into the Atlantic from water discharged by the Amazon and upwelling currents off West Africa. The Sargassum Belt, while in the Sargasso Sea, is different, composed of different morphological types of Sargassum. The Sargassum Belt has also been found to possess lower biodiversity than the Sargasso Sea and is mainly composed of more highly nutrient-efficient organisms.

The Sargasm Belt forms in the North Atlantic Gyre as currents push the material into one mass, similar to the  North Atlantic garbage patch.

See also
 Great Calcite Belt
 North Atlantic garbage patch

References

External links
USF Sargassum Watch

 Algal blooms